The Carer  is a 2016 British-Hungarian comedy film directed by János Edelényi.

Plot
Young Hungarian home care assistant Dorottya (Coco König) looks after aging Shakespearian actor Sir Michael Gifford (Brian Cox).

Cast 
 Coco König - Dorottya
 Brian Cox - Sir Michael Gifford
 Maitland Chandler - Freddy
 Ruth Posner - Dolly
 Selina Cadell - Mrs. Trudeau
 Andor Lukáts - Uncle Ferenczi
 Roger Moore - Himself

References

External links 
 
 

British comedy films
Hungarian comedy films
English-language Hungarian films
2010s English-language films
2010s British films
English-language comedy films